Maria Sole is a feminine Italian name. It may refer to:

Maria Sole Agnelli, entrepreneur and politician
Maria Sole Ferrieri Caputi, association football referee
Maria Sole Tognazzi, film director

Italian feminine given names